Kurkovichi is a rural locality (a selo) in Starodubsky District, Bryansk Oblast, Russia. The population was 455 as of 2010. There are 10 streets.

Geography 
Kurkovichi is located 36 km south of Starodub (the district's administrative centre) by road. Azarovka is the nearest rural locality.

References 

Rural localities in Starodubsky District